The following radio stations broadcast on FM frequency 101.3 MHz:

Argentina
 Radio Hollywood in Rosario, Santa Fe
 LRI400 in Venado Tuerto, Santa Fe

Australia
 2CFM in Gosford, New South Wales
 3WPR in Wangaratta, Victoria
 3WWM in Horsham, Victoria
 TOTE Sport Radio in Devonport, Tasmania
 101.3 FM Noosa Community Radio in Noosa, Sunshine Coast Queensland

Belize
Lighthouse Radio at San Pedro Town

Canada (Channel 267)
 CBRR-FM in Cranbrook, British Columbia
 CBWA-FM in Manigotagan, Manitoba
 CHEQ-FM in Sainte-Marie, Quebec
 CIFM-FM-4 in Clinton, British Columbia
 CIME-FM-2 in Mont-Tremblant, Quebec
 CJAI-FM in Stella, Ontario
 CJCH-FM in Halifax, Nova Scotia
 CJEG-FM in Bonnyville, Alberta
 CJNK-FM-1 in Algonquin Park, Ontario
 CJNK-FM-2 in Algonquin Park, Ontario
 CJSA-FM in Toronto, Ontario
 CJSK-FM in Campement Sarcelle, Quebec
 CKII-FM in Dolbeau/Mistassini, Quebec
 CKIK-FM in Red Deer, Alberta
 CKKN-FM in Prince George, British Columbia
 CKOT-FM in Tillsonburg, Ontario
 CKUN-FM in Christian Island, Ontario
 CKXG-FM-1 in Lewisporte, Newfoundland and Labrador
 VF2150 in Labrador City, Newfoundland and Labrador

 VF2545 in Powell River, British Columbia

Germany
Klassik Radio in Berlin
Antenne 1 in Stuttgart

India 
 FM Rainbow 101.3 in Bengaluru, Karnataka and its surrounding regions run by All India Radio

Malaysia
 Buletin FM in Klang Valley
 Era in Miri, Sarawak
 Ai FM in Kedah, Perlis and Penang
 Wai FM in Kuching, Sarawak

Mexico
 XHAPS-FM in Agua Prieta, Sonora
 XHAW-FM in Monterrey, Nuevo León
 XHAWD-FM in San Luis Potosí, San Luis Potosí
 XHBN-FM in Ciudad Delicias, Chihuahua
 XHCAV-FM in Durango, Durango
 XHFX-FM in Guaymas, Sonora
 XHIW-FM in Uruapan, Michoacán
 XHMAB-FM in Ciudad del Carmen, Campeche
 XHMSL-FM in Los Mochis, Sinaloa
 XHPORO-FM in Concepción del Oro, Zacatecas
 XHPTUX-FM in San Juan Bautista Tuxtepec, Oaxaca
 XHSCCH-FM in Calvillo, Aguascalientes
 XHSCDL-FM in Juchitán, Oaxaca
 XHTAN-FM in Huayacocotla, Veracruz
 XHTQ-FM in Ixhuatlancillo, Veracruz
 XHVP-FM in Atlixco, Puebla
 XHZA-FM in Toluca, Estado de México

United States (Channel 267)
 KARV-FM in Ola, Arkansas
  in Idyllwild, California
 KBNF-LP in Ruston, Louisiana
 KDPX in Pine Bluff, Arkansas
  in Richfield, Minnesota
 KERW in Los Osos-Baywood Par, California
  in Wichita, Kansas
 KFEZ in Walsenburg, Colorado
  in Pasco, Washington
  in Anchorage, Alaska
 KHNZ in Lefors, Texas
  in Forsyth, Montana
 KIOI in San Francisco, California
  in Durango, Colorado
 KJSO-LP in Omaha, Nebraska
 KKEE in Centerville, Texas
  in Sulphur, Louisiana
  in Whiting, Iowa
 KLAW in Lawton, Oklahoma
  in Westport, Washington
  in Falls City, Nebraska
 KMCO in Wilburton, Oklahoma
 KMMZ in Crane, Texas
  in Sinton, Texas
 KOBT-LP in Grand Forks, North Dakota
 KOWI in Oatman, Arizona
 KOXE in Brownwood, Texas
 KOZY-FM in Bridgeport, Nebraska
 KPCG-LP in Edmond, Oklahoma
 KRGR-LP in Paradise, California
  in Fallon, Nevada
  in Chinook, Montana
 KSIB-FM in Creston, Iowa
 KTGC-LP in Saint Regis, Montana
 KTZE-LP in Kountze, Texas
 KUKE-LP in Kula, Hawaii
 KUUL in East Moline, Illinois
 KWIE in Hinkley, California
 KWTO-FM in Buffalo, Missouri
 KXNB-LP in Omaha, Nebraska
 KYLZ in Albuquerque, New Mexico
  in Dothan, Alabama
  in Smiths, Alabama
  in Manchester, Ohio
  in West Lafayette, Indiana
  in Vicksburg, Mississippi
  in Grand Rapids, Michigan
  in Buckhannon, West Virginia
  in Boonville, New York
 WCHK-FM in Milford, Delaware
  in South Fulton, Tennessee
 WCPV in Essex, New York
 WDRO-LP in Monticello, Mississippi
 WECO-FM in Wartburg, Tennessee
 WEVI in Frederiksted, Virgin Islands
 WFAQ-LP in Mukwonago, Wisconsin
  in Richmond, Indiana
  in Scranton, Pennsylvania
 WHIW-LP in Harvard, Illinois
  in Port Saint Lucie, Florida
 WIHE-LP in Liberty, Kentucky
 WIUK-LP in Iuka, Mississippi
 WJDQ in Meridian, Mississippi
 WJJD-LP in Kokomo, Indiana
 WJKE in Stillwater, New York
  in Hamden, Connecticut
 WKFT in Strattanville, Pennsylvania
 WKGF in Grenada, Mississippi
 WKJJ-LP in Milwaukee, Wisconsin
 WMCI in Mattoon, Illinois
 WMJM in Jeffersontown, Kentucky
  in Sturgis, Kentucky
 WNCO-FM in Ashland, Ohio
 WNHE-LP in New Haven, Indiana
 WOHP-LP in Huntsville, Ohio
 WOPC in Linden, Tennessee
 WPJQ-LP in Milwaukee, Wisconsin
 WPVR-LP in Mount Airy, North Carolina
  in Chauncey, Georgia
 WQMR-LP in Rocky Mount, Virginia
 WRKD-LP in Rockford, Ohio
  in Rochester, New York
  in Lancaster, Pennsylvania
  in Sault Sainte Marie, Michigan
  in Williston, Florida
 WTOA-LP in Albany, Georgia
 WVAI-LP in Charlottesville, Virginia
  in Virginia, Illinois
 WVQM in Augusta, Maine
  in Hampton, Virginia
  in Sumter, South Carolina
  in Wilmington, North Carolina
  in Farmville, Virginia
  in Haverhill, New Hampshire
  in Narrows, Virginia

References

Lists of radio stations by frequency